William Yule may refer to:

 Billy Yule (born 1954), American musician
 William Yule (psychologist) (born 1940), psychologist and professor of applied child psychology